German submarine U-124 (nickname "Edelweissboot") was a Type IXB U-boat of Nazi Germany's Kriegsmarine during World War II. She operated in the Atlantic as part of the 2nd U-boat flotilla, both west of Scotland and east of the eastern US coast. She was also present off northern South America.

She was sunk with all hands west of Portugal on 2 April 1943.

Service history
U-124 was laid down on 11 August 1939 at the DeSchiMAG AG Weser yard in Bremen as yard number 956. She was launched on 9 March 1940 and commissioned on 11 June, with Kapitänleutnant Georg-Wilhelm Schulz in command. The core of the crew came from Schulz's previous command, U-64, which had been sunk during the Norwegian campaign, the survivors had been rescued by Wehrmacht mountain troops and their badge, the Edelweiss, was painted on U-124's conning tower in appreciation. He was relieved on 8 September 1941 by Korvettenkapitän Johann Mohr. He remained in command until the boat's loss in 1943.

Design
German Type IXB submarines were slightly larger than the original German Type IX submarines, later designated IXA. U-124 had a displacement of  when at the surface and  while submerged. She had two shafts and two  propellers.

U-124 was fitted with six  torpedo tubes (four fitted at the bow and two at the stern), 22 torpedoes, one  SK C/32 naval gun, 180 rounds, and a  SK C/30 as well as a  C/30 anti-aircraft gun. The boat had a complement of forty-eight.

Service history

U-124 conducted eleven war patrols, sinking 46 ships, totalling  and sinking two warships, totaling . She also damaged four ships, totalling . She was a member of two wolfpacks.

First patrol
U-124s first patrol began with her departure from Wilhelmshaven on 19 August 1940. Her route took her across the North Sea and through the gap between the Faroe and Shetland Islands. She attacked three ships northwest of Scotland; Stakesby, Harpalyce and Firecrest, all on the 25th. The Royal Navy  dropped 12 depth charges. Striking rocks on the sea-bed, the boat lay there for an hour, the corvette lost contact, but the collision had damaged three of her torpedo tubes. As a result, she spent the rest of the patrol reporting on the weather.

The submarine docked at Lorient on the French Atlantic coast, on 16 September.

Second patrol
U-124s second foray was conducted further northwest of the Scottish mainland. The next day, 17 October, the Royal Navy   fired three torpedoes at her. All missed, and U-124 remained unaware of the attack.

The latter ship's four survivors, on a raft when the U-boat came to investigate, played dead as they did not wish to be taken prisoner.

Third patrol
On her third sortie U-124 sank Empire Thunder north-northeast of Rockall on 6 January 1941.

Fourth patrol
On her fourth patrol the boat sank 11 ships, four on the same day north of the Cape Verde Islands on 8 March 1941; Nardana, Hindpool, Tielbank and Lahore . One account claims that after sinking her, U-124 surfaced and captured the liner's fourth officer from a lifeboat, and that he was never seen again.

Corinthic was first struck by a dud torpedo, but another functioned correctly and sank the ship.

Fifth patrol
U-124 drew a blank on her fifth sortie, failing to destroy a single target. She scoured the central Atlantic southwest of Gibraltar, but found nothing.

Sixth patrol
Her sixth patrol was successful. Mohr, (her new commander), rather ambitiously claimed two ships totaling 15,000 tons sunk and a third vessel of 8,000 tons damaged. The reality was rather different. Baltallin (1,303 GRT) on 20 September 1941 and Empire Moat (2,922 GRT) also on the 20th, were both lost from Convoy OG-74; they went down north northeast of the Azores.

In addition, Empire Stream was sunk on 25 September. Among the dead were two stowaways. A final effort on 26 September accounted for three more ships, also near the Azores: Petrel, Cortes, and Siremalm (there were no survivors from the latter vessel).

U-124 returned to Lorient on 1 October.

Seventh patrol
After almost a month in her base, U-124 started her seventh patrol on 30 October 1941. On 24 November, she was engaged by the Royal Navy   which, with two consorts, had been searching for the Armed Merchant Raider Atlantis and her supply ship Python. Dunedin was hit by two torpedoes, despite being outside the theoretical range of the U-boat's projectiles and sank 17 minutes later. 419 men died; there were 67 survivors.

The submarine remained in the South Atlantic and sank the American Sagadahoc on 3 December. She was the fourth and last American ship to be sunk by the U-boat Arm prior to the U.S. entry into the war. Following a six-hour chase Mohr fired on Sagadahoc claiming her lights were not set correctly.

U-124 was shelled by the coastal battery at Fort Thornton, Georgetown on Ascension Island on 9 December; no damage was sustained.

Eighth patrol
A change of operational area saw the boat deploy to the Eastern United States seaboard following the success of Operation Drumbeat (Paukenschlag); leaving Lorient on 21 February 1942. Like the original 'drumbeaters', Mohr found the US defences easy to penetrate.

She then sank seven ships and damaged two more – all in March. One of them, E. M. Clark, was hit in such a way that her whistle sounded continuously until the ship went down. Another, Esso Nashville, was hit by a torpedo which failed to detonate, but a subsequent torpedo broke the tanker's back. She was held together only by deck plates and piping. The bow and stern sections soon separated, and the bow soon sank. The stern was towed to Baltimore where it was fitted with a new fore-part and the ship returned to service in March 1943.

Two more ships were hit before U-124 returned to Lorient. It was her most successful patrol; 68,215 GRT of shipping was lost or incapacitated.

Ninth patrol
It was back to the mid-Atlantic for the boat's ninth patrol, as part of Wolfpack Hecht, beginning on 4 May 1942. Four ships from Convoy ON 92 were sunk on the 12th. U-124s next victim was the Free French corvette Mimosa which was sunk with heavy loss of life on 9 June. Many of the casualties came from St. Pierre et Miquelon. The impact of the sinking had a lasting effect in the community.

Two more ships were sunk before the boat returned to Lorient on 26 June.

Tenth patrol
Another change of operational zone, this time to the northern coastal area of South America. The submarine left Lorient on 25 November 1942.

The boat was attacked by a US Catalina flying boat on 1 January 1943 east of Port of Spain. No damage was caused.

She sank four more ships; Broad Arrow, Birmingham City, Collingsworth and Minotaur, all on the ninth. Unfortunately this torpedo then hit Minotaur despite strenuous evasive action by her helmsman.

Eleventh patrol and loss
U-124 left Lorient for the last time on 27 March 1943.

All 53 crew members died.

Wolfpacks
U-124 took part in two wolfpacks, namely:
 Süd (22 July – 5 August 1941)
 Hecht (8 May – 18 June 1942)

Summary of raiding history

References

Notes

Citations

Bibliography

External links

1940 ships
German Type IX submarines
U-boats sunk by British warships
Ships built in Bremen (state)
U-boats commissioned in 1940
World War II submarines of Germany
Maritime incidents in April 1943
Saint Helena and Dependencies in World War II